Sunday Heroes is a 1952 Italian sports drama film directed by Mario Camerini and starring Raf Vallone, Cosetta Greco and Marcello Mastroianni.  It was shot at the Titanus Studios in Rome and on location at the San Siro in Milan. The film's sets were designed by the art director Piero Filippone as well as former Italy national team coach Vittorio Pozzo. It features many players from the A.C. Milan team of the era. Vallone had been a professional footballer before turning to acting.

Synopsis
A struggling team at the bottom of the Serie A standings travel to play A.C. Milan knowing that a defeat will see them relegated. Staying in a hotel ahead of Sunday's game, the various players experience the city in different ways and the club's regular goalkeeper is injured, requiring his place to be taken by the inexperienced, young Marini. Meanwhile Gino Bardi, the club's star striker, is approached via his girlfriend to deliberately throw the game in exchange for a large sum of money. 

Despite her pressure, he refuses, but his performance in the first half is poor and the team are trailing by two goals. The team's fans mistakenly believe that he has indeed been bought off. In the interval the team's doctor informs him that tests done the day before show him to be seriously ill and advises him not to return to the pitch, but Bardi insists on going out for the second half. He spearheads the team's recovery, coming from behind to lead 4-3 before he collapses and has to be stretched off. In the final moments Milan are awarded a penalty but Marini, who has had a bad game, miraculously saves it to win the game.

Bardi, recuperating in hospital, is visited by Mariolina the club's secretary who is much better suited to him than his previous girlfriend.

Cast

 Raf Vallone as Gino Bardi
 Cosetta Greco  as  Mara
 Marcello Mastroianni as  Carlo Vagnetti
 Paolo Stoppa as Piero
 Franco Interlenghi as Marini
 Enrico Viarisio as 	Cerchio, Radio commentator
 Marisa Merlini as  Lucy, Wife of Radio commentator
 Guglielmo Barnabò as  President
 Sandro Ruffini as  Doctor
 Ada Dondini as Aunt Carolina
 Galeazzo Benti  as  The suitor
 Gianni Cavalieri  as Carlo, Brother of Piero
 Erno Crisa as Stefan
 Guido Martufi  as 'Lenticchia'
 Elena Varzi as Mariolina
 Franca Tamantini as Annetta
 Giovanna Scotto as Mother of Gino
 Terttù Sandborg as Marica László, the chambermaid
 Maria Pia Trepaoli as 	Carmela
 Alma Giusi as 	Renée, Mara's friend
 Cesare Fantoni as Corrupt executive
 Michele Malaspina as Corrupt executive
 Juan Carlos Lamas as Annetta's Fiancé 
 Valentino Valli as 	Footballer
 Florindo Stocchi as Alberto De Michelis - footballer
 Emilio Carton as 	Footballer
 Aldo Nardi as 	Footballer
 Carlo Annovazzi as himself 
 Lorenzo Buffon as himself 
 Lajos Czeizler as 	Himself 
 Gunnar Gren as 	Himself 
 Nils Liedholm as himself 
 Vittorio Pozzo as himself
 Gunnar Nordahl as himself 
 Omero Tognon as himself

References

Bibliography 
 Foot, John. Calcio: A History of Italian Football. Fourth Estate, 2006. 
 Moliterno, Gino. The A to Z of Italian Cinema. Scarecrow Press, 2009.

External links

1952 films
1950s Italian-language films
Italian sports drama films
1950s sports drama films
Italian black-and-white films
Films directed by Mario Camerini
Italian association football films
1952 drama films
Films scored by Alessandro Cicognini
1950s Italian films
Films shot in Milan
Films set in Milan